Laestadites is an extinct genus of fungi with unknown classification.

The genus was first described by Aloysius Luigi Meschinelli in 1892.

Species:
 Laestadites nathorstii Mesch.

References

Enigmatic fungus taxa
Fungus genera
Prehistoric fungi